The Phum Duang River (rarely also called the Khiri Rat River) is a river in Surat Thani Province, southern Thailand, the main tributary of the Tapi River.

The river has a total length of 80 km.

Etymology 
The etymology of "Phum Duang" is unknown but the etymology for "Khiri Rat" originated from the rivers origination point being in the Khiri Rat Nikhom District at the confluence of the Phrasaeng and Sok rivers.

References

Rivers of Thailand
Geography of Surat Thani province
Kra Isthmus